Ouse may refer to:

Places

Rivers in England
 River Ouse, Yorkshire
 River Ouse, Sussex 
 River Great Ouse, Northamptonshire and East Anglia
 River Little Ouse, a tributary of the River Great Ouse

Other places
 Ouse, Tasmania, a town in Australia
 The Ouse, an estuary on Shapinsay, in the Orkney Islands, Scotland
 Grand River (Ontario), Canada, formerly known as the Ouse

Ships
 MV River Ouse, an Empire F type coaster in service with R H Hunt & Sons, Hull, 1947-52
 HMS Ouse (1905), a River-class destroyer of 1905

See also
 Ouse Bridge (disambiguation)
 Oise a department in northern France
 Oise (river), a river in Belgium and northern France
 Ouseburn, a river in Tyne and Wear, England
 
 
 List of rivers of the United Kingdom